Anssi Mauricio Albornoz Inola (born 10 March 1988) is a Swedish footballer who plays for Akropolis IF as a midfielder.

Personal life
Albornoz's father is Chilean and his mother is of Finnish descent. Mauricio has a younger brother, Miiko, who plays for Hannover 96.

References

External links
 
 
 
 

1988 births
Living people
Swedish footballers
Sweden under-21 international footballers
Swedish people of Chilean descent
Swedish people of Finnish descent
Sportspeople of Chilean descent
Association football midfielders
IF Brommapojkarna players
IFK Göteborg players
Åtvidabergs FF players
GIF Sundsvall players
AFC Eskilstuna players
IK Sirius Fotboll players
Syrianska FC players
Gröndals IK players
Akropolis IF players
Allsvenskan players
Superettan players